NA-142 Sahiwal-II is a constituency for the National Assembly of Pakistan.

Election 2002 

General elections were held on 10 Oct 2002. Rana Tariq Javed (independent candidate) won by 42,885 votes. He then joined Pakistan Muslim League (Q)

Election 2008 

General elections were held on 18 Feb 2008. Ghulam Farid Kathia of PPP won by 38,926 votes.

Election 2013 

General elections were held on 11 May 2013. Chaudhary Muhammad Ashraf of PML-N won by 94,012 votes and became the  member of National Assembly.

Election 2018

See also
NA-141 Sahiwal-I
NA-143 Sahiwal-III

References

External links 
Election result's official website

NA-161